Meowingtons Hax Tour Trax is a compilation album by artists who are signed to deadmau5's record label, mau5trap. It was made to promote the artists and his Meowingtons Hax Tour, which was named after his cat, Professor Meowingtons. Despite the name, only one of the tracks on the album is by deadmau5, and the rest are by other artists, including Skrillex, Moguai, Excision and Feed Me.

The Beatport edition of this album contains remix stems of both "Blast Wave" by Al  and "Deviance" by Excision and Datsik, both which are tracks on the album. "Where My Keys" was omitted.

Track listing

External links

References

2011 compilation albums
Deadmau5 albums
Mau5trap albums
Ultra Records albums
Virgin Records albums
Record label compilation albums